William Bispham Propsting, CMG (4 June 1861 – 3 December 1937) was an Australian politician and member of the Tasmanian House of Assembly, who served as Premier of Tasmania from 9 April 1903 to 11 July 1904.

Early life
Propsting was born in Hobart, the son of Henry Propsting. He was educated at the Derwent School, Hobart, and went to South Australia in 1879 entering the education department as a pupil teacher. He studied at the training college and at the University of Adelaide, and rose to be first assistant at the Sturt Street School, Adelaide. He returned to Tasmania in 1886, studied law, and was admitted to the bar in 1892.

Political career
In February 1899 Propsting entered politics as member for Hobart in the Tasmanian House of Assembly, and in August 1901 was elected leader of the opposition. He became premier and treasurer on 9 April 1903, his party being known as the liberal democratic party. He succeeded in re-organising the education department and established a training college at Hobart, but most of his party's attempts to bring in democratic legislation were blocked by the Tasmanian Legislative Council. Propsting resigned on 11 July 1904 and was leader of the opposition until December 1905. He was then elected a member of the legislative council, and in May 1906 joined the Sir John W. Evans ministry as attorney-general and minister for education. This ministry resigned in June 1909. From April 1916 to August 1922 Propsting was attorney-general and minister for railways in Sir W. H. Lee's ministry, and was attorney-general in the Hayes ministry which succeeded it until August 1923. He was elected president of the legislative council in July 1926 and held this position with distinction until his death at Hobart on 3 December 1937.

Legacy
Propsting married twice; firstly to Caroline Emma Coles in 1893, and secondly to Lilias Macfarlane in 1925, who survived him with a son and two daughters of the first marriage. He was made a Companion of the Order of St Michael and St George (CMG) in 1932.

References

External links
D. Nairn Thorp, 'Propsting, William Bispham (1861 - 1937)', Australian Dictionary of Biography, Volume 11, MUP, 1988, pp 302–303.

1861 births
1937 deaths
Premiers of Tasmania
Australian Companions of the Order of St Michael and St George
Politicians from Hobart
Presidents of the Tasmanian Legislative Council
Leaders of the Opposition in Tasmania
Treasurers of Tasmania
20th-century Australian politicians